SFJ may refer to:

 Saphenofemoral junction, an anatomical structure in the groin
 StarFlyer (ICAO airline code)
 Kangerlussuaq Airport (IATA airport code)
 Super Formula Japan, a Japanese car-racing championship